
Gmina Jabłoń is a rural gmina (administrative district) in Parczew County, Lublin Voivodeship, in eastern Poland.

Neighbouring gminas
Gmina Jabłoń is bordered by the gminas of Dębowa Kłoda, Milanów, Parczew, Podedwórze and Wisznice.

Villages
The gmina contains the following villages having the status of sołectwo: Dawidy, Gęś, Holendernia, Jabłoń, Kalinka, Kolano, Kolano-Kolonia, Kudry, Łubno, Paszenki, Puchowa Góra and Wantopol.

References

Polish official population figures 2006

Jablon
Parczew County